The 28th parallel south is a circle of latitude that is 28 degrees south of the Earth's equatorial plane. It crosses the Atlantic Ocean, Africa, the Indian Ocean, Australasia, the Pacific Ocean and South America.

At this latitude the sun is visible for 13 hours, 57 minutes during the December solstice and 10 hours, 19 minutes during the June solstice.

Around the world
Starting at the Prime Meridian and heading eastwards, the parallel 28° south passes through:

{| class="wikitable plainrowheaders"
! scope="col" width="125" | Co-ordinates
! scope="col" | Country, territory or ocean
! scope="col" | Notes
|-
| style="background:#b0e0e6;" | 
! scope="row" style="background:#b0e0e6;" | Atlantic Ocean
| style="background:#b0e0e6;" |
|-
| 
! scope="row" | 
|
|-valign="top"
| 
! scope="row" | 
| Northern Cape North West - for about 15 km Northern Cape - for about 25 km North West - for about 21 km Free State KwaZulu-Natal
|-
| style="background:#b0e0e6;" | 
! scope="row" style="background:#b0e0e6;" | Indian Ocean
| style="background:#b0e0e6;" | 
|-valign="top"
| 
! scope="row" | 
| Western Australia South Australia Queensland, notably Gold Coast, Queensland by the Pacific
|-
| style="background:#b0e0e6;" | 
! scope="row" style="background:#b0e0e6;" | Pacific Ocean
| style="background:#b0e0e6;" | just south of Marotiri, 
|-
| 
! scope="row" | 
|
|-valign="top"
| 
! scope="row" | 
| Inland it notably demarcates the chief southern border of Chaco Province, namely with Santa Fe Province. 
|-valign="top"
| 
! scope="row" | 
| Rio Grande do Sul Santa Catarina: notably just south of Florianópolis by the Atlantic
|-
| style="background:#b0e0e6;" | 
! scope="row" style="background:#b0e0e6;" | Atlantic Ocean
| style="background:#b0e0e6;" | 
|}

See also
27th parallel south
29th parallel south

s28
Borders of Argentina
Borders of Queensland